Among the Oak & Ash is the debut, self-titled album by the group Among the Oak & Ash, which consists of Josh Joplin and Garrison Starr. The album was released on June 16, 2009, on Verve Records.

Track listing
 "Hiram Hubbard" – 3:39
 "Peggy-O" – 2:50
 "Angel Gabriel" – 2:49
 "Shady Grove" – 1:52
 "The Water Is Wide" – 5:31
 "The Housewife's Lament" – 2:35
 "Pretty Saro" – 1:19
 "All the Pretty Little Horses" – 3:04
 "Come All You Fair and Tender Ladies" – 0:49
 "Joseph Hillström 1879–1915" – 3:41
 "Look Down That Lonesome Road" – 3:03
 "High, Low & Wide" – 5:15
 "Bigmouth Strikes Again" – 2:56

References

2009 albums
Among the Oak & Ash albums